Lenzie railway station is a railway station serving Lenzie and Kirkintilloch in East Dunbartonshire, Scotland. Trains on the Glasgow to Edinburgh via Falkirk Line pass Lenzie by. The station is served by ScotRail.

History 
The station was opened as Kirkintilloch Junction on 5 July 1848 by the Edinburgh and Glasgow Railway, being renamed three times by the North British Railway, to Campsie Junction in December 1849, Lenzie Junction in November 1867 and finally Lenzie in June 1890.

To the east of the station was a complex of junctions which allowed eastbound trains to travel to  via the Campsie Branch of the Edinburgh and Glasgow Railway, and to Garnqueen South Junction and Gartsherrie North Junction (both with the Caledonian Railway Main Line) to  via the Monkland and Kirkintilloch Railway.

Services 
Monday to Saturdays, there is a half-hourly service southbound to Glasgow and northbound to Dunblane or Alloa (hourly to each).

The latter was formerly served from here throughout the day, but the Glasgow to Falkirk Grahamston service was re-routed to run via  in the mid 1990s to free up paths on the main line. Also, there is a once a day (Monday - Friday) service from Glasgow - Markinch in the evening.

On Sundays, there is an hourly service in each direction to Glasgow and Alloa with the first eastbound service of the day going to Aberdeen via Stirling, Perth, Dundee and Arbroath.

References

Notes

Sources

External links 

Video on the infrastructure and Environs of Lenzie railway station

Railway stations in East Dunbartonshire
Former North British Railway stations
Railway stations in Great Britain opened in 1848
SPT railway stations
Railway stations served by ScotRail
Lenzie
Kirkintilloch